Thorne Memorial Park Miniature Railway is a  gauge and  gauge miniature railway built in 1998 in Thorne, South Yorkshire, England, operating on two loops within the park.

History
Born in the late 1970s out of an idea to form a society to further the aims of those with an interest of model engineering. The then "Doncaster Model Engineering Society" built its track at the rear of the most famous railway place on earth, "Doncaster Plant Works". Birthplace of Mallard, Flying Scotsman, Green Arrow, Cock of the North to name a few.

The group laid 900 feet of  ground-level track. Only five years later, they were dismayed to be told after all this hard work had been done that below the top soil, underneath the track bed lies "The Works" dumping ground of blue asbestos boiler lagging. At the end of the 1984 operating season, and with winter approaching the opportunity arose to consider the next move. Well somebody moved it, the track that is. Only problem was they forgot to tell the group about it, the whole of the track disappeared, removed by a person or persons unknown.

The group then met at a local factory, a members home and a country pub until an approach to Thorne Parish Council in 1996, to see if they wanted a miniature railway in their local park, was welcomed by the council. Plans were submitted and the appropriate permission was given. The council offered the use of a very solid brick building a former Second World War air raid shelter, with power and a nearby water supply, a better start could not have been wished for. The building is now the locomotive depot, which was recently adapted by the addition of a  steel end door for the rolling stock to gain access to it.

The first stage of the venture at Thorne was completed by late July 1998, with a  loop of dual  ground-level track with a  branch line to the preparation area and locomotive shed. In 2000 the Doncaster Model Engineering Society became the Doncaster & District Model Engineering Society Limited. A second loop of  track was laid in 2003–04, with a diamond crossing connecting the two. More recent work to the loco shed has seen the installation of a  steel door to enable locomotives and rolling stock to be taken out directly on the track. Installation of fencing at the Thorne Central Station area provides a new central platform.

The train service was now becoming a regular feature in the park with good support from the local population and many visitors from other parts of Britain and Overseas. It operates on Sundays from Easter to the end of October, there is no winter running. The service also runs on  the annual Thorne Festival weekend. The society has a new web site, www.thornerailway.webs, this is now the official website of the Doncaster & District Model Engineering Society.

Locomotives
Club Steam Locomotives
Koppel: This large red narrow gauge steam locomotive was built in 1985  to the Ken Swan design. Locomotive renamed "RON" in honour of Ron Smelt. 
Princes Sarah: Standard gauge outline industrial owned and built by Paul Tattersall
class 20 named enya also owned by paul tattersall
Club Electric locomotives
John L Stokes: Mainline outline Bo-Bo battery electric locomotive, named after a club member who donated many parts of this locomotive to the club. Livery Crimson lake red with white cabs and small yellow warning panels.

The Duke: Narrow gauge bogie steeple cab Bo-Bo battery electric locomotive painted BR blue with yellow ends.

Club Petrol locomotive
 060 shunter, powered by Honda 90 petrol engine awaiting restoration to working condition.

Rolling stock
2001 coaches: 2 off  bogie coaches sit-astride bodies painted crimson lake red, 2016 bogie coach No 3 built also painted crimson lake red. Coach no. 4 built June 2018, painted crimson lake red.
Bogie driving truck, designed and built by Paul Tattersall.  Bogie brake truck for use by the guard. Bogie driving truck based on a British Rail Diesel brake tender built by 17D miniatures in 2018 painted BR green livery.

References

7¼ in gauge railways in England
Miniature railways in the United Kingdom
Tourist attractions in South Yorkshire